The following is a list of episodes for the 1980s animated series He-Man and the Masters of the Universe.

Production order
The following is a list of episodes of the television series. (Note: the episodes are listed here in production order, which differs from the broadcast order.) The first script commissioned was "The Cosmic Comet". The pilot episode "Diamond Ray of Disappearance" (MU004), was the fourth script approved but the first episode produced and intended to air first, which indeed it did in the U.K., U.S. and many markets.

Season 1 (1983)

Season 2 (1984)

Broadcast order

There is a lot of confusion over the exact order of the episodes of the series. The production codes allocated appear to indicate nothing more than the formal clearance of an episode's script. Often, this order is directly contradicted on screen. For example, "The Return of Orko's Uncle" (MU023) has an earlier production code than the introduction of "Orko's Favourite Uncle" (MU027).

Season 1 (1983)

Diamond Ray of Disappearance (26 September 1983)
Teela's Quest (27 September 1983)
Colossor Awakes (28 September 1983)
The Dragon Invasion (29 September 1983)
The Curse of the Spellstone (30 September 1983)
The Time Corridor (3 October 1983)
Song of Celice (4 October 1983)
Creatures from the Tar Swamp (5 October 1983)
She-Demon of Phantos (6 October 1983)
Reign of the Monster (7 October 1983)
Like Father, Like Daughter (10 October 1983)
Disappearing Act (11 October 1983)
Evil-Lyn's Plot (12 October 1983)
Dawn of Dragoon (13 October 1983)
Prince Adam No More (14 October 1983)
A Friend in Need (17 October 1983)
Daimar the Demon (18 October 1983)
The Dragon's Gift (19 October 1983)
The Shaping Staff (20 October 1983)
The Cosmic Comet (21 October 1983)
The Taking of Grayskull (24 October 1983)
Double Edged Sword (25 October 1983)
Quest for He-Man (26 October 1983)
Orko's Favorite Uncle (27 October 1983)
Quest for the Sword (28 October 1983)
A Beastly Sideshow (31 October 1983)
A Tale of Two Cities (1 November 1983)
Valley of Power (2 November 1983)
Game Plan (3 November 1983)
The Return of Orko's Uncle (4 November 1983)
The Mystery of Man-E-Faces (7 November 1983)
Keeper of the Ancient Ruins (8 November 1983)
The Region of Ice (9 November 1983)
Masks of Power (10 November 1983)
Ordeal in the Darklands (11 November 1983)
City Beneath the Sea (14 November 1983)
The Defection (15 November 1983)
Teela's Trial (16 November 1983)
The Starchild (17 November 1983)
Orko's Missing Magic (18 November 1983)
The Search (21 November 1983)
Eternal Darkness (22 November 1983)
The Royal Cousin (23 November 1983)
Return of Evil (24 November 1983)
Eye of the Beholder (25 November 1983)
It's Not My Fault (28 November 1983)
Trouble in Arcadia (29 November 1983)
Castle of Heroes (30 November 1983)
Temple of the Sun (1 December 1983)
Wizard of Stone Mountain (2 December 1983)
Dree Elle's Return (5 December 1983)
The Sleepers Awaken (6 December 1983)
Return of the Gryphon (7 December 1983)
The Return of Granamyr (8 December 1983)
Pawns of the Game Master (9 December 1983)
The Huntsman (12 December 1983)
The Remedy (13 December 1983)
The House of Shokoti Episode I (14 December 1983)
The House of Shokoti Episode II (15 December 1983)
The Witch and the Warrior (16 December 1983)
Evilseed (19 December 1983)
The Once and Future Duke (21 December 1983)
Search for the VHO (20 December 1983)
Golden Disks of Knowledge (22 December 1983)
The Heart of a Giant (23 December 1983)

Season 2 (1984–85)

The Cat and the Spider (24 September 1984)
Day of the Machines (25 September 1984)
The Energy Beast (26 September 1984)
Trouble in Trolla (27 September 1984)
Fisto's Forest (28 September 1984)
The Gamesman (1 October 1984)
Betrayal of Stratos (2 October 1984)
To Save Skeletor (3 October 1984)
The Great Books Mystery (4 October 1984)
The Rarest Gift of All (5 October 1984)
The Ice Age Cometh (8 October 1984)
Disappearing Dragons (9 October 1984)
The Shadow of Skeletor (10 October 1984)
The Arena (11 October 1984)
Island of Fear (12 October 1984)
Attack from Below (15 October 1984)
The Littlest Giant (16 October 1984)
Fraidy Cat (17 October 1984)
Just a Little Lie (18 October 1984)
The Rainbow Warrior (19 October 1984)
Things That Go Bump in the Night (22 October 1984)
Three on a Dare (23 October 1984)
Into the Abyss (24 October 1984)
Jacob and the Widgets (25 October 1984)
One for All (26 October 1984)
Trouble's Middle Name (29 October 1984)
Revenge is Never Sweet (30 October 1984)
A Bird in the Hand (31 October 1984)
Search for the Past (1 November 1984)
Hunt for He-Man (2 November 1984)
The Good Shall Survive (5 November 1984)
Not so Blind (6 November 1984)
The Greatest Show on Eternia (7 November 1984)
Origin of the Sorceress (23 September 1985)
A Trip to Morainia (24 September 1985)
Journey to Stone City (25 September 1985)
Battlecat (26 September 1985)
The Time Wheel (27 September 1985)
The Secret of Grayskull (30 September 1985)
No Job Too Small (1 October 1985)
The Bitter Rose (2 October 1985)
The Gambler (3 October 1985)
Teela's Triumph (4 October 1985)
Orko's New Friend (7 October 1985)
The Problem with Power (9 October 1985)
Double Trouble (14 October 1985)
The Eternia Flower (16 October 1985)
Happy Birthday Roboto (17 October 1985)
Battle of the Dragons (23 October 1985)
Time Doesn't Fly (31 October 1985)
Here, There, Skeletors Everywhere (1 November 1985)
Beauty and the Beast (4 November 1985)
Orko's Return (5 November 1985)
Visitors from Earth (6 November 1985)
Monster on the Mountain (7 November 1985)
The Magic Falls (8 November 1985)
Search for a Son (11 November 1985)
Mistaken Identity (12 November 1985)
The Toy Maker (13 November 1985)
Bargain with Evil (14 November 1985)
Capture the Comet Keeper (15 November 1985)
The Ancient Mirror of Avathar (18 November 1985)
The Games (19 November 1985)
To Save the Creatures (20 November 1985)
The Cold Zone (21 November 1985)

References

External links
Episode guide at the Big Cartoon DataBase

He-Man and the Masters of the Universe
Masters of the Universe